Global Thunder is an annual U.S. nuclear strategic command and control exercise that is designed to train U.S. Strategic Command forces and assess joint operational readiness.  This large-scale training exercise has a primary focus on nuclear readiness and creating conditions for strategic deterrence against a variety of threats. Global Thunder encompasses all missions, including strategic deterrence, space operations, cyberspace operations, joint electronic warfare, global strike, missile defense and intelligence, and lasts for approximately 10 days. Global Thunder is meant to create realistic training activities against simulated opposition, with the goal to improve and maintain nuclear readiness and strategic deterrent capabilities. This training involves increased bomber flights, missileer training, and SSBN readiness, verifying reliability and resilience of the nuclear triad.

Participating nations 
Global Thunder, a globally integrated exercise, involves allied personnel from a variety of nations, including permanently assigned foreign liaison officers from:

 United Kingdom
 Republic of Korea
 Denmark
 Canada
 Australia

History 
Global Thunder has been held annually since the first documented GT training exercise in 2014, GT 15. The exercises commonly start around the end of October to the beginning of November and last for approximately 10 days.

Global Thunder 15 
GT 15 lasted for an 11-day period from October 17–28, 2014.

Participants 
 Air Force Global Strike Command
 8th Airforce
 2nd Bomb Wing
 307th Bomb Wing

Global Thunder 16 

GT 16's military training exercise started on the November 2, 2015. The Air Force Global Strike Command (AFGSC) maintained its leading role in the GT training exercise. AFGSC is responsible for organizing, training, and equipping the nation's Intercontinental Ballistic Missile and bomber forces.

Participants

 Barksdale AFB, Louisiana
 Minot AFB, North Dakota
 Whiteman AFB, Missouri
 F.E. Warren AFB, Wyoming
 Malmstrom AFB, Montana

Global Thunder 17 

GT 17 started on October 24, 2016, and concluded on October 31, lasting approximately 8 days. Global Thunder 17 presented USSTRATCOM the opportunity to host U.K. and Canadian officers. Major General Heidi V. Brown, USSTRATCOM director of global operations, explained that  “Global Thunder 17 also provided us a chance to increase our interoperability between each of the combatant commands involved as well as our interagency partners and allies.”

Global Thunder 18 
GT 18 ended on November 7, 2017. After the conclusion of the training exercises U.S. Navy Rear Adm. Daniel Fillion, director of global operations for U.S. Strategic Command, and U.S. Navy Rear Adm. William Houston, deputy director for strategic targeting and nuclear mission planning, sat down and traded insights on the mission rehearsals. This was the first Global Thunder program and USSTRATCOM exercise that Filion and Houston participated in.

References

External links
 
 
 
 

 Military exercises and wargames
Military exercises involving the United States
United States Strategic Command